Miguel Ángel Botta (10 October 1941 – 29 August 2019) was an Argentine boxer. He competed in the men's flyweight event at the 1960 Summer Olympics.

References

External links
 

1940 births
2019 deaths
Argentine male boxers
Olympic boxers of Argentina
Boxers at the 1960 Summer Olympics
Boxers at the 1959 Pan American Games
Pan American Games gold medalists for Argentina
Pan American Games medalists in boxing
Boxers from Buenos Aires
Flyweight boxers
Medalists at the 1959 Pan American Games